Sarfeher is a white Hungarian wine grape planted primarily in the Great Hungarian Plain. In addition to making still, varietal wines Sarfeher is also used in sparkling wine production.

References

White wine grape varieties